"La mia città" is a song by Italian singer Emma Marrone. It was chosen by Italy's public broadcaster RAI to represent the country at the Eurovision Song Contest 2014.

The song received only 33 points in the final vote, ranking at 21st place out of 26 in the final ranking of the competition. This represents one of the worst placements in Italy's Eurovision Song Contest history – its lowest ever finish by absolute finishing position, although not its worst relative finish or score (having previously finished 17th and joint-last with nul points in the 1966 contest with Domenico Modugno's "Dio, come ti amo").

Charts

Certifications

See also
 Italy in the Eurovision Song Contest 2014

References

Italian songs
2013 songs
Emma Marrone songs
Eurovision songs of Italy
Eurovision songs of 2014
Articles containing video clips
Universal Music Group singles